Edelstein is an unincorporated village just off Illinois Route 40 in Peoria County, Illinois,  north of Peoria City Hall, approximately  north of the city limits of Peoria and  west of Chillicothe.

Edelstein's main business is a manufacturing company named International Supply Company, which owns several blocks of the village.

Edelstein is home to one of the most formidable mainline railroad grades on the BNSF Railway's Chillicothe Subdivision. The crest of the grade is just east of town, and the hill is known to railroaders and rail fans alike as "Edelstein Hill".

History
A post office has been in operation at Edelstein since 1888. The community's name honors John Edelstein, a railroad official.

On June 25, 2009, the historic Hub Ballroom was destroyed by fire. Built in 1938, this building hosted celebrity appearances by Glenn Miller, Guy Lombardo, Jerry Lee Lewis, and others.

Notable residents
Clarence W. Spicer, inventor of the Spicer joint

References

Unincorporated communities in Peoria County, Illinois
Unincorporated communities in Illinois
Peoria metropolitan area, Illinois